Ryu Jagwang or Ryu Ja-Gwang (korean:류자광, hanja:柳子光, 1439 – June 1512) was a Korean Joseon Dynasty politician, soldier and writer. He was an illegitimate child. His courtesy name was Ubok (우복, 于復), Ucheon (우천, 宇天). His prime political rival was Kim Jong-jik.

Popular culture
 Portrayed by Ryu Tae-ho in the 2017 MBC TV series The Rebel.
 Portrayed by Yoo Seung-bong in the 2017 KBS2 TV series Queen for Seven Days.

External links
 Ryu Jagwang:Nate 
 Ryu Jagwang:Naver 
 Ryu Jagwang 
 Ryu Jagwang 

1439 births
1512 deaths
Korean admirals
Korean generals
Military history of Korea
15th-century Korean people
Korean military personnel killed in action
People from South Jeolla Province
Joseon writers
Joseon politicians